GKS Katowice – is a Polish professional men's volleyball team, one of the sections of the same name club based in Katowice. The club was promoted to the highest level of the Polish Volleyball League – PlusLiga in 2016.

Team
As of 2022–23 season

Coaching staff

Players

See also

References

External links
 Official website 
 Team profile at PlusLiga.pl
 Team profile at Volleybox.net

Polish volleyball clubs
Sport in Katowice
Volleyball clubs established in 1964
1964 establishments in Poland